Rabbi Jacob bar Idi  (Hebrew: רבי יעקב בר אידי, Rabbi Ya'akov bar Idi) was a second generation Amora sage of the Land of Israel, and one of the most prominent sages of his generation.

Biography
He was the pupil of Joshua ben Levi, and resided at Tyre. The prominent sages Rav Nachman and Rav Zeira saw him in a special way, and whenever there were doubts concerning his studies they would send off a messenger to ask him about it, and he would  refer to him as "Master". He is often cited together with R. Samuel ben Nahman.

Teachings
He ruled that even though havdalah may be recited until Tuesday evening, the blessing on the havdalah candle may only be recited on Saturday night.

References 

Talmud rabbis of the Land of Israel